Gerardo L. Munck is a political scientist specializing in comparative politics. He is professor of political science and international relations at the University of Southern California.

Career
Munck earned his undergraduate degree in political science from the University of New Hampshire, a master's in Latin American studies at Stanford University, and his PhD in political science from the University of California, San Diego (UCSD). Munck was a professor at the University of Illinois, Urbana-Champaign between 1990 and 2002, before moving to the University of Southern California (USC).

Academic research
Munck works in the field of comparative politics specializing in political regimes, democracy, and methodology. His recent work focuses on the relationship between democracy and state capacity, on critical junctures, and on politics in Latin America

Munck is also known for his research in the field of the science of knowledge and his oral histories of leading scholars in political science and comparative politics.

The conceptualization and measurement of democracy
Munck's award winning article with Jay Verkuilen “Conceptualizing and Measuring Democracy" (2002) introduced a widely used distinction between issues of conceptualization, measurement, and aggregation. In work with Jørgen Møller and Svend-Erik Skaaning (2020), Munck elaborated this framework and argued that, "counter to an empiricist approach to measurement," attention should be placed "squarely on theoretical concepts" and "the link between theoretical concepts and measures."

The state and democracy
Munck, in his work with Sebastián L. Mazzuca, has advanced the argument that the process of state formation, and the resulting level of state capacity, affects the process of democratization as well as the quality of democracy. In A Middle-Quality Institutional Trap: Democracy and State Capacity in Latin America (2020), Mazzuca and Munck maintain that "States can make democracy and democracy can make States," but that they do so "only under certain macroconditions, which trigger the causal mechanisms that make the State–democracy interaction a virtuous cycle." They compare advanced democracies to Latin America and show that "in Latin America, the State–democracy interaction has not generated a virtuous cycle." They explain the poor quality of Latin American democracies in terms of various factors, including the legacy of state formation in the nineteenth century.

Problems of and for democracy
Munck's book Latin American Politics and Society: A Comparative and Historical Analysis (2022) has been hailed as a "titanic enterprise that combines historical, cross-national, and case-specific knowledge with simple yet sharp analytical idea." One of its overarching themes is the interaction between problems of democracy, "problems linked to the attainment, maintenance, and improvement of democracy," and problems for democracy, "problems regarding the development and strengthening of civil
and social rights that citizens expect or hope democracies will deliver." Munck argues that "problems of democracy have prevented the elimination of problems for democracy, and problems for democracy block the possibility of reducing problems of democracy."

Work with International Organizations

United Nations Development Programme (UNDP)
Munck collaborated with Dante Caputo and Guillermo O'Donnell in the preparation of the United Nations Development Programme’s (UNDP) report Democracy in Latin America. Toward a Citizens’ Democracy (2004).

He also worked with Dante Caputo on a second regional report on democracy in Latin America prepared by the UNDP and the Organization of American States (OAS), Nuestra democracia (2010).

With the UNDP, he elaborated a system to monitor corruption in Afghanistan, and wrote background papers for the UNDP regional reports on Asia and the Pacific on corruption and gender equality.

Organization of American States (OAS)

Munck developed a methodology to monitor elections for the Organization of American States (OAS).

Open Government Partnership (OGP)

Munck was a member of the inaugural International Experts Panel of the Open Government Partnership.

Personal life

Munck's grandmother is swimmer Lilian Harrison. His brother is sociologist Ronaldo Munck.

Selected publications

Books and Edited Volumes

Latin American Politics and Society: A Comparative and Historical Analysis (with J.P. Luna; Cambridge University Press, 2022).

Critical Junctures and Historical Legacies: Insights and Methods for Comparative Social Science, co-editor with David Collier (Rowman & Littlefield, 2022).

A Middle-Quality Institutional Trap: Democracy and State Capacity in Latin America (with Sebastián L. Mazzuca; Cambridge University Press, 2020).

La calidad de la democracia: Perspectivas desde América Latina, co-editor with Sebastián Mantilla Baca (Quito, Ecuador: CELAEP and Fundación Hans Seidel, 2013). 

Measuring Democracy: A Bridge between Scholarship and Politics (Johns Hopkins University Press, 2009).

Passion, Craft, and Method in Comparative Politics (with Richard Snyder; Johns Hopkins University Press, 2007).

Regimes and Democracy in Latin America, editor (Oxford University Press, 2007).

“Regimes and Democracy in Latin America”, co-editor with David Collier. Special Issue of Studies in Comparative International Development 36, 1 (Spring 2001): 3–141. 

Authoritarianism and Democratization: Soldiers and Workers in Argentina, 1976-83 (Penn State University Press, 1998).

Articles

"Introduction: Tradition and Innovation in Critical Juncture Research," pp. 1–29, in David Collier and Munck (eds.), Critical Junctures and Historical Legacies: Insights and Methods for Comparative Social Science, Lanham, MD: Rowman & Littlefield, 2022.

“The Theoretical Foundations of Critical Juncture Research: Critique and Reconstruction,” pp. 109–37, in David Collier and Munck (eds.), Critical Junctures and Historical Legacies: Insights and Methods for Comparative Social Science, Lanham, MD: Rowman & Littlefield, 2022. 

“Conceptualization and Measurement: Basic Distinctions and Guidelines,” pp. 331–52, in Luigi Curini and Robert Franzese (eds.), The SAGE Handbook of Research Methods in Political Science and International Relations, Vol. 1, with Jørgen Møller and Svend-Erik Skaaning. Thousand Oaks, CA: Sage, 2020. 

“Comparative Politics at a Crossroad: Problems, Opportunities and Prospects from the North and South,” with  Richard Snyder. Política y Gobierno (Mexico) Vol. 26, Nº 1 (2019): 139-58. 

“Modernization Theory as a Case of Failed Knowledge Production.” The Annals of Comparative Democratization 16, 3 (2018): 37-41. 

"Building Blocks and Methodological Challenges: A Framework for Studying Critical Junctures," with David Collier, Qualitative and Multi-Method Research 15, 1 (2017). 

"What is Democracy? A Reconceptualization of the Quality of Democracy." Democratization, 23, 1 (2016): 1-26. 

"Building Democracy … Which Democracy? Ideology and Models of Democracy in Post-Transition Latin America." Government and Opposition 50, 3 (2015): 364-93. 

"State or Democracy First? Alternative Perspectives on the State-Democracy Nexus," with Sebastián L. Mazzuca. Democratization 21, 7 (2014): 1221-43. 

"Democratic Politics in Latin America: New Debates and Research Frontiers." Annual Review of Political Science 7 (2004): 437-62. 

"Tools for Qualitative Research,"  pp. 105–21, in Henry E. Brady and David Collier (eds.), Rethinking Social Inquiry: Diverse Tools, Shared Standards, Boulder, Col. and Berkeley, Cal.: Rowman & Littlefield and Berkeley Public Policy Press, 2004.

"Conceptualizing and Measuring Democracy: Evaluating Alternative Indices," with Jay Verkuilen. Comparative Political Studies 35, 1 (2002): 5-34. 

"The Regime Question: Theory Building in Democracy Studies." World Politics 54, 1 (2001): 119-44. 

"Game Theory and Comparative Politics: New Perspectives and Old Concerns." World Politics 53, 2 (2001): 173-204. 

"Modes of Transition and Democratization. South America and Eastern Europe in Comparative Perspective," with Carol Leff. Comparative Politics 29, 3 (1997): 343-62.  

"Disaggregating Political Regime: Conceptual Issues in the Study of Democratization." Helen Kellogg Institute for International Studies Working Paper 228 (1996).

References

External links
 Personal Website
 
 Gerardo Munck Papers at SSRN
 The Critical Juncture Project, coordinated by David Collier and Gerardo L. Munck 
 Website on Latin American politics

University of Southern California faculty
Argentine political scientists
American political scientists
Latin Americanists
Living people
People from Buenos Aires
Argentine emigrants to the United States
1958 births